Jodie Yemm (born 1967) is an Australian actress, best known for her roles in television soap operas.

She played Jennifer Healy in Sons and Daughters, Rosemary Kaye in Prisoner, and Kelly Morgan in Neighbours, and The Sullivans as Maisey, as well as appearing in The Flying Doctors.

Personal life 
She is the daughter of late actor, singer and sportsman Norman Yemm and his wife Amanda Yemm.

External links
 

Living people
Australian television actresses
1967 births
Actresses from Melbourne